The 139th Airlift Wing (139 AW) is a unit of the Missouri Air National Guard, stationed at Rosecrans Air National Guard Base, St. Joseph, Missouri. If activated to federal service, the Wing is gained by the United States Air Force Air Mobility Command.

Overview
The 139th Airlift Wing provides the State of Missouri and the nation with immediately deployable, combat-ready C-130H2 Hercules model aircraft.  The 139th remains globally engaged in continuing operations.

Units
The 139th Airlift Wing consists of the following units:
 139th Operations Group
 180th Airlift Squadron
 139th Maintenance Group
 139th Mission Support Group
 139th Medical Group

History
On 14 April 1962, the Missouri Air National Guard 180th Air Transport Squadron was authorized to expand to a group level, and the 139th Air Transport Group was established by the National Guard Bureau, the 180th ATS becoming the group's flying squadron. Other squadrons assigned into the group were the 139th Headquarters, 139th Material Squadron (Maintenance), 139th Combat Support Squadron, and the 139th USAF Dispensary.

The 139th Air Transport Group was assigned to Military Air Transport Service (MATS), equipped with 4-engined C-97 Stratofreighter transports.  From St. Joseph, the 180th augmented MATS airlift capability worldwide in support of the Air Force's needs.  Throughout the 1960s, the unit flew long-distance transport missions in support of Air Force requirements, frequently sending aircraft to Europe, Alaska, the Caribbean, Hawaii, Japan, the Philippines, and during the Vietnam War, to both South Vietnam, Okinawa and Thailand.  With the realignment of MATS to Military Airlift Command (MAC), the squadron was re-designated as a Military Airlift Squadron on 8 January 1966.

Air Refueling

In 1969, military requirements resulted in a change in mission when the group was reassigned from MAC transport duties to the Strategic Air Command (SAC). Under SAC the group became an Air Refueling unit, being with the air refueling version of the C-97 transport, the KC-97 Stratofreighter. Familiarity with the aircraft led to a smooth transition from MAC to the new refueling mission.  It supported the United States Air Forces in Europe (USAFE) flying aerial refueling missions in the KC-97 supporting missions of deploying aircraft to NATO for tactical exercises.

Tactical Airlift

In 1976 the KC-97s were retired by SAC and the unit was returned to MAC.   The 139th was re-equipped with C-130A Hercules tactical airlifters and returned to its transport mission.  With the C-130s the 180th supported Operation Volant Oak and Operation Coronet Oak at Howard Air Force Base, Panama.

During a 180th deployment to Howard AFB in November, 1978, they were caught up in a "real world" situation when the world began to learn of the events unfolding in Jonestown, Guyana. The 180th, flying the C-130, was the first US military aircraft landing at Timehri International Airport, Guyana with US embassy officials that they had picked up in Venezuela as well as food and supplies meant for the survivors the Americans hoped to take out of Guyana. That, of course, was before it became apparent that most of the more than 900 Peoples Temple members were lying dead in Jonestown.

In December, 1989, the 180th was once again deployed at Howard AFB when Operation Just Cause began. The 180th flew combat mission in support of the Operation. In late 1980 and through 1983, members of the 180th embarked on a special project to enhance survivability of C-130 aircrews while flying in a hostile environment. The need for this type of training became apparent after C-130 units from the Military Airlift Command (MAC) began to participate in Red Flag at Nellis AFB. It was obvious that the C-130's were not doing well against the ground and air threats posed in the Red Flag exercise. After approval from the National Guard Bureau and tacitly from Military Airlift Command (MAC), they began service test to validate the training program. After more than three service test, the program proved it worth and the Advanced Airlift Tactics Training Center was approved and instituted on 4 February 1984.

In March 1987, the 180th began to receive brand new C-130H2 Hercules aircraft replacing the C-130A model aircraft they had flown for the past ten years. In October 1987, the 180th deployed two C-130H2 aircraft supporting a United States Army Special Forces (SF) and the Royal Australian Special Air Service Regiment (SAS) in a joint personnel airdrop exercise called Badge Anvil 1987 at RAAF Learmonth, Australia. The exercise provided high altitude low opening and high altitude high opening parachute training. Since all of the airdrops occurred above 10,000 feet and as high as 24,500 feet, the 15th Physiological Training Flight, USAF, also supported the exercise and provided supplemental oxygen equipment, training and support for the training missions. Each flight was like going to the altitude chamber.

In 1989, the 180th with four C-130H2 aircraft deployed to Kimhae International Airport, Republic of Korea in support of Operation Team Spirit 1989. During the exercise, the 180th flew challenging missions including tactical resupply, fuel bladder missions, assault landings on short runways including landing on highway landing strips, numerous airdrop missions including both visual, high altitude and radar drop scenarios.

1991 Gulf War

The 180th Tactical Airlift Squadron was ordered to the active service on 28 December 1990, as a result of the Iraqi invasion of Kuwait to support Operation Desert Shield. For some unit members, this would be a return to the Persian Gulf as they had volunteered and deployed with 2 C-130H aircraft, aircrews, maintenance and support personnel, to form the first Air National Guard provisional airlift squadron in September 1990. On 2 January 1991, the 180th TAS and its 8 C-130H aircraft and personnel departed Rosecrans Air National Guard Base for Al Ain Air Base, United Arab Emirates (UAE) and were redesignated as the 1632nd Tactical Airlift Squadron (Provisional) as part of the 1630th Tactical Airlift Wing (Provisional) which was under the 1610th Airlift Division (Provisional). The unit remained at Al Ain Air Base through the air war and the ground war flying combat and combat support missions in support of the allied operations. Beginning on 22 March 1991, the 180th TAS redeployed to Al Kharj Air Base, Kingdom of Saudi Arabia. The 180th TAS departed Al Kharj Air Base on 28 May 1991, and returned to Rosecrans Air National Guard Base on 30 May 1991. When the aircraft arrived home, they had "nose art" on each courtesy of the crew chiefs. The nose art was 391 "Connie Kay", 392 "Desert Possum", 393 "Spirit of St. Joe", 394 "The Hog", 395 "Chief", 396 "Buzzard", 397 "Riders on the Storm" and 398 "Fike's Filly". The 180th TAS was relieved from active duty and released back to state control on 24 June 1991.

During the 1990s, the 180th provided airlift support to the United States Air Forces Europe during the airlift operations into Bosnia and Herzegovina. These operations were named Operation Provide Promise, Operation Joint Endeavor, Operation Joint Guard and Operation Joint Forge. Members of the 180th along with operations support and maintenance personnel would deploy to Rhein-Main Air Base and, after it closed, to Ramstein Air Base and assigned to "Delta Squadron". The Air National Guard would generally be responsible for a 90- or 120-day period and guard members would typically volunteer for duty for a minimum of a two- to three-week period although some would volunteer for longer periods.

Global War on Terrorism

Following the attacks on 11 September 2001, the 180th served in a support role flying missions transporting personnel and equipment in support of Operation Enduring Freedom.

The 180th Airlift Squadron was notified in February 2003 that it would be partially mobilized as a result of the impending conflict in Iraq which would later be known as Operation Iraqi Freedom. The unit deployed in March 2003 to the Iraqi theater and later supported Operation Enduring Freedom in Afghanistan and was released from active duty in March 2006 and reverted to state control. This was a historic partial mobilization that lasted three years.   The 180th remained in a state of partial activation for three years until it was released from mobilization in March 2006 and reverted to state control.

Lineage
 Designated 139th Air Transport Group, and allotted to Missouri ANG, 1962
 Extended federal recognition and activated, 14 April 1962
 Re-designated: 139th Military Airlift Group, 8 January 1966
 Inactivated on 5 September 1969
 Established as  139th Air Refueling Group, and activated 6 September 1969
 Re-designated: 139th Tactical Airlift Group, 1 October 1976 
 Consolidated with 139th Military Airlift Group, 31 May 1991, which had been inactivated on 5 September 1969 
 Re-designated: 139th Airlift Group, 8 April 1992
 Status changed from Group to Wing, 1 October 1995
 Re-designated: 139th Airlift Wing, 1 October 1995

Assignments
 Missouri Air National Guard, 14 April 1962
 Gained by: Eastern Transport Air Force, (EASTAF), Military Air Transport Service
 Gained by: Twenty-First Air Force, Military Airlift Command, 8 January 1966
 Gained by: Tactical Air Command, 6 September 1969
 Gained by: Military Airlift Command, 1 October 1976
 Gained by: Air Mobility Command, 1 June 1992
 Gained by: Air Combat Command, 1 October 1993 
 Gained by: Air Mobility Command, 1 October 1997-Present

Components
 139th Operations Group, 1 October 1995 – Present
 180th Air Transport (later Military Airlift, Air Refueling, Tactical Airlift, Airlift) Squadron, 14 April 1962-Present

Stations
 Rosecrans Memorial Airport, St Joseph, Missouri, 14 April 1962
 Elements operated from: Al Ain International Airport, Al Ain, United Arab Emirates, 28 December 1990 – 24 June 1991
 Designated: Rosecrans Air National Guard Base, Missouri, 1991-Present
 Elements operated from Iraq and Afghanistan, March 2003-March 2006 (Operation Iraqi Freedom, Operation Enduring Freedom)

Aircraft
 C-97 Stratofreighter, 1962-1968
 KC-97 Stratofreighter, 1968-1976
 C-130A Hercules, 1976-1987
 C-130H2 Hercules, 1987–Present

References 

 139th Airlift Wing website history
 139th Airlift Wing@globalsecurity.org

External links

 139th Airlift Wing
 139th Airlift Wing completes humanitarian mission

Wings of the United States Air National Guard
Military units and formations in Missouri
0139